Emmanuel Benner (28 March 1836, in Mulhouse – 23 September 1896, in Nantes) was a French Academic painter and draughtsman. The son of the painter Jean Benner-Fries, he was twin to fellow artist, Jean Benner, and the uncle of the painter Emmanuel Michel Benner, Jean's son. Like his twin brother, he was portrayed by fellow Alsatian, Jean-Jacques Henner.

Biography 
Emmanuel Benner studied under his father, and under Jean-Jacques Eck (1812–1887) at the School for industrial design (école de dessin industriel) of Mulhouse, then in Paris with Henner and with Léon Bonnat. He started exhibiting paintings at the Salon de Paris in 1867 and would do so regularly until his death. The Benner twins also collaborated as designers with their other fellow Alsatian, ceramist and potter Théodore Deck. Their styles being very similar, they occasionally worked together on a painting, such as the Allégorie de l’Exposition Universelle de Paris en 1878, filled with beautiful women, one of their favourite subjects.

Benner is buried with his brother and his nephew in the family tomb in Père Lachaise Cemetery, in Paris.

Collections
Benner's work is held in the permanent collections of the Victoria and Albert Museum, Musée des Beaux-Arts de Mulhouse, the Walters Art Museum, the Strasbourg Museum of Modern and Contemporary Art, the Unterlinden Museum, the Musée d'Orsay, among others.

Gallery

References

External links 

19th-century French painters
French male painters
French draughtsmen
French designers
1836 births
1896 deaths
Artists from Mulhouse
Burials at Père Lachaise Cemetery
Painters from Alsace
French twins
19th-century French male artists